WFIN (1330 AM) is a radio station  broadcasting a mixed news/talk and sports talk format. Licensed to Findlay, Ohio, United States, the station is currently owned by Blanchard River Broadcasting Company, which is owned by The Findlay Publishing Company.

History

WFIN first went on the air December 15, 1941, under the ownership of Findlay Radio Company, headed by Cloyce W. Oxley, who also served as the station's general manager.  Studios and offices were located at 500 1/2 South Main Street in downtown Findlay.  The station operated at its current frequency and daytime power, but with no nighttime authorization.

In September 1949, WFIN was sold to Findlay Publishing Company.  R.L. Heminger was the company president, and Harold Heminger was named general manager. In 1957, studios and offices were moved to the second floor of 101 West Sandusky Street.

In late 1987, the FCC granted limited nighttime power parameters for Class III Regional stations, including WFIN.  The following year, WFIN began broadcasting with nighttime power of 79 watts, as it continues to do today.

Studios and offices were moved in 1993 to a new, state of the art facility on Lake Cascades Parkway in Findlay. Concurrent with the studio move was the formation of Blanchard River Broadcasting Company, the new licensee set up as a subsidiary company of Findlay Publishing Company.  WFIN and its sister stations remain there today.

FM Translator
WFIN also has an FM translator, W238CX, to extend the coverage of the main AM station; it also provides the listener the ability to listen on the FM band, providing high fidelity stereophonic sound.

Programming
WFIN airs a mix of news/talk and sports talk programming, including Fox News Radio's Brian Kilmeade, Westwood One's Dan Bongino, and Dave Ramsey.

CBS Sports Radio airs in the evening and overnight hours during the week, and the bulk of the day on weekends.

References

External links

FM translator

FIN